, often called , is a Japanese singer, actress and radio host. She is a member of Japanese girl group 9nine.

Filmography 
Satake has her own radio show, Satake Uki no Utyu wo Kirei ni Suru Radio, since July 3, 2012. The show is currently airing every Sunday on Japan's Nippon Broadcasting System, in which she often plays her own renditions of 9nine's songs as well as songs by other artists.

TV drama
Wagahai wa shufu de aru (TBS, 2006)
Kaijoken Musashi -gakkō he ikō!- (Fuji TV, 2007)
Koizora (TBS, 2008)
Chōdōken ga oshiete kureta chikara -Asunaro gakkō no monogatari- (TBS, 2009)
Boku no himitsu heiki (NBN, 2009)
Kaibutsu-kun (NTV, 2010)
Atsuizo!Nekogaya!! (NBN, 2010)
Hao-Hao! Kyonshi Girl (TV Tokyo, 2012)
Soratobu kōhōshitsu (TBS, 2013)

Anime
Rainbow - Nisha Rokubō no Shichinin (NTV, 2010) Satake Wukipedia
Chihayafuru (NTV, 2013) schoolgirl
Hunter × Hunter (2011 anime) (NTV, 2013) Podungo Lapoy, Kite-chan
Space Dandy (Tokyo MX, 2014) QT
The World Is Still Beautiful (NTV, 2014) Mikia
Space Dandy II (Tokyo MX, 2014) QT
Terror in Resonance (Fuji TV, 2014) Mobko
Soreike! Anpanman (NTV, 2014) Cat girl
Doraemon (2005 anime) (TV Asahi, 2015) Sheep Conductor
Mob Psycho 100 (Tokyo MX, 2016) Tsubomi Takane
Carole & Tuesday (Fuji TV, 2019) IDEA, Angela's rabbit doll
Mob Psycho 100 III (2022) Tsubomi Takane
Uzumaki (TBA) Kirie Goshima

References

External links
 

1992 births
Living people
Actresses from Tokyo

Singers from Tokyo
Japanese idols
Japanese television actresses
Japanese voice actresses
Japanese women pop singers
Japanese female models
21st-century Japanese actresses
21st-century Japanese singers
21st-century Japanese women singers